'See also: 
1982 in South African sport, 
1983 in South Africa, 
1994 in South African sport and the 
Timeline of South African sport.

Boxing
 23 September - Gerrie Coetzee, the South African heavyweight boxing champion, wins the World Boxing Association (WBA) title in Akron, Ohio  by knocking out American Michael Dokes and becomes the first South African boxer to win a world heavyweight title. (See: Gerrie Coetzee vs. Michael Dokes )''

Motorsport
 15 October - The South African Grand Prix, is held at Kyalami

 
South Africa